Batavi may refer to:
Batavi (Germanic tribe)
Revolt of the Batavi
Batavi (military unit)
Batavi (software), e-commerce software
Batavi (album), album by Dutch pagan/folk metal band Heidevolk

See also
Batavia (disambiguation)
Betawi (disambiguation)